

Draw

 NB: The Semifinals and Final were the best of 5 sets while all other rounds were the best of 3 sets.

Final

Section 1

Section 2

External links
 1974 Paris Open draw

Singles